Nakul Vaid is an Indian actor who has appeared in the film The Lunchbox (2013), Ab Tak Chhappan (2004) and Chak De! India (2007). He also played the lead roles in films like Samvedna (2002), With Love Tumhara (2006) and Mohandas (2009).

He first rose to fame with the television series - Ittefaq in 2002 where he played younger brother of Rajesh Khanna. The Indian Express in their review appreciated the storyline but criticized his role writing that Vaid "neither looks nor sounds like a Mohandas".

Filmography

Films

Television

References

External links
 

Indian male film actors
Living people
Year of birth missing (living people)